Cheese on toast is made by placing sliced or grated cheese on toasted bread and melting it under a grill. It is popular in the United Kingdom, Ireland, Australia and New Zealand, the Caribbean and in African countries. 

It is also known as roasted cheese in the West of Scotland.

Recipes

Cheese on toast consists of toast (toasted on both sides or just one side), with cheese placed on it and then grilled. Further toppings are optional; the most basic being chopped onions (raw or grilled with the cheese), brown sauce  or ketchup. Pickled cucumber, Branston pickle, fried tomatoes, fried eggs, Worcestershire sauce and baked beans are also common.

Recipe books and internet articles tend to elaborate on the basics, adding ingredients and specifying accompaniments to make more interesting reading. Consequently, published recipes seldom deal with the most basic form of the dish and frequently refer to the similar dish of Welsh rarebit as "posh cheese on toast".

Cheddar cheese is most commonly used for cheese on toast, as it is a particularly good cheese for toasting. Lancashire dairies, in conjunction with a "National Cheese Toast Day", have promoted Lancashire cheese as the best cheese to use.

See also

References

British cuisine
Irish cuisine
Caribbean cuisine
Australian cuisine
New Zealand cuisine
African cuisine
Cheese dishes
Toast dishes
Food combinations